Magruder's is a grocery store and former chain in and around the Washington, D.C. metropolitan area. The store is owned by a family who were born and grew up in the Washington area. Magruder's is known for offering low prices on produce and other groceries. The store is smaller than those of larger chains, so the variety and availability of some products sometimes does not equal that of these larger chains. In 2006, Magruder's removed their loyalty cards, that allow the holder to save money on purchases. In January 2013 Magruder's sold its Connecticut Avenue, D.C. store (which will continue to operate under the Magruder's name) and began liquidation sales at its other four stores.

History
In 1875, John H. Magruder purchased the grocery store at 1417 New York Avenue NW, Washington, D.C. where he had worked for ten years.

Some, including the owners since 2013, claim a link to "Commodore John Magruder", presumably Confederate General John B. Magruder.

External links

References

Supermarkets of the United States
Privately held companies based in Washington, D.C.
Retail companies established in 1875
1875 establishments in Washington, D.C.
American companies established in 1875